The 2021 Calcutta Football League Premier Division A was the 123rd season of the top state-level football  league of West Bengal. It was held between mid-August and November of 2021. Due to the COVID-19 pandemic, it was decided to cancel Calcutta League last season, but was played this year.

Changes from last season

Rules and regulations 
Owing to the COVID-19 pandemic in West Bengal, the tournament format is shortened by adopting a league-cum-knockout format. The 14 participating teams would be divided into two groups and each team would play against all the other teams in their respective groups once. The top three teams from each group would earn a direct quarter final berth. The remaining four teams from each group would play against each other once for the last two quarter final spots. The eight qualified teams would then play knockout matches to reach the final of Premier Division A. From similar reasons ATK Mohun Bagan and East Bengal have not participated.

The IFA has also increased the number of overseas players a club could register from 4 to 6, but only 2 can be named in the starting eleven.

The teams would be exempted from relegation this season as the lower divisions of CFL are cancelled due to the pandemic situation.

Promoted clubs 
 United
 Railway
 Tollygunge Agragami
 Kidderpore

Relegated clubs 
 NBP Rainbow
 Kalighat Milan Sangha

Teams

Managers and captains

Foreign players

Group stage

Group A 

Note: East Bengal withdrew from the league hence the oppositions were awarded walkover of 3 goals.

Fixtures and results

Group B 

Note: ATK Mohun Bagan withdrew from the league hence the oppositions were awarded walkover of 3 goals.

Fixtures and results

Elimination round

Knockout stage

See also
 2021–22 season in state football leagues of India

References

Calcutta Premier Division
2021–22 in Indian football leagues
2021–22 in Indian football